Matsu Nangan Airport  is one of the airports in Matsu Islands, Lienchiang County, Fukien Province, Taiwan (ROC). It is located on the Nangan Island, near the Jieshou Village. It also serves as a heliport. The facility can only handle turboprop planes like the ATR 72-600.

Airlines and destinations

Transportation
The airport is accessed by private car or taxis via the only roadway Zhongyang Boulevard.

See also
 Civil Aeronautics Administration (Taiwan)
 Transportation in Taiwan
 List of airports in Taiwan

References

External links

Official site

Airports in Lienchiang County
Nangang Township